Nothing Hurts is the debut album by noise-pop band Male Bonding.  It was placed at number 72 in NME magazines '75 best albums of 2010'.

Track listing
 "Year's Not Long" – 2:34
 "All Things This Way" – 1:28
 "Your Contact" – 1:44
 "Weird Feelings" – 2:17
 "Franklin" – 2:45
 "Crooked Scene" – 2:23
 "T.U.F.F." – 1:54
 "Nothing Remains" – 1:41
 "Nothing Used to Hurt" – 2:41
 "Pirate Key" – 2:10
 "Paradise Vendors" – 2:38
 "Pumpkin" – 2:15
 "Worse to Come (feat. Vivian Girls)" – 2:34

References

2010 debut albums
Male Bonding (band) albums
Sub Pop albums